William Longespée, 3rd Earl of Salisbury (born in or before 11677 March 1226) ("Long Sword", Latinised to de Longa Spatha) was an Anglo-Norman nobleman, primarily remembered for his command of the English forces at the Battle of Damme and for remaining loyal to his half-brother, King John. His nickname "Longespée" is generally taken as a reference to his great physical height and the oversize weapons that he used.

Early life

William was an illegitimate son of Henry II, King of England. His mother was unknown for many years until the discovery of a charter William made that mentions "Comitissa Ida, mater mea" (Countess Ida, my mother). This referred to Ida de Tosny, a member of the prominent Tosny (or Toesny) family, who had married Roger Bigod, 2nd Earl of Norfolk in 1181.

King Henry acknowledged William as his son and gave him the honour of Appleby, Lincolnshire, in 1188. Eight years later, his half brother King Richard I married him to a great heiress, Ela of Salisbury, 3rd Countess of Salisbury, and granted him the title and lands of the earldom.

During the reign of King John, Salisbury was at court on several important ceremonial occasions and held various offices: High Sheriff of Wiltshire; lieutenant of Gascony; constable of Dover; and Lord Warden of the Cinque Ports; and later warden of the Welsh Marches. He was appointed sheriff of Cambridgeshire and Huntingdonshire about 1213.

Military career

Charter witness lists place him in Normandy during Richard I's campaigns to recover lands seized by King Philip II whilst the king of England had been away on crusade. In 1205, William was sent to Poitou to command a small force of knights alongside John's bastard son, Geoffrey, after John's plans for a full scale expedition were squashed.
Salisbury was a commander in the king's Welsh and Irish expeditions of 1210–1212 and was appointed Viceroy of Ireland, jointly with John de Gray, Bishop of Norwich, when the king left for England in 1210. The king also granted him the honour of Eye in Suffolk.

In 1213, Salisbury led a large fleet to Flanders, where he seized or destroyed a good part of a French invasion fleet anchored at or near Damme. This ended the invasion threat but not the conflicts between England and France. In 1214, Salisbury was sent to help Otto IV of Germany, an English ally, who was invading France. Salisbury commanded the right wing of the army at their disastrous defeat in that year at the Battle of Bouvines, where he was captured.

By the time he returned to England, revolt was brewing amongst the barons. Salisbury was one of the few who remained loyal to John, except for a few months in 1216. In the civil war that took place the year after the signing of the Magna Carta, Salisbury was one of the leaders of the king's army in the south. He was made High Sheriff of Wiltshire again, this time for life. After raising the siege of Lincoln with William Marshall he was also appointed High Sheriff of Lincolnshire (in addition to his current post as High Sheriff of Somerset) and governor of Lincoln castle. However, after the French prince Louis (later Louis VIII) landed as an ally of the rebels, Salisbury went over to his side. Presumably, he thought John's cause was lost.

After John's death and the departure of Louis, Salisbury, along with many other barons, joined the cause of John's young son, now Henry III of England. He held an influential place in the government during the king's minority and fought in Gascony to help secure the remaining part of the English continental possessions. He was appointed High Sheriff of Devon in 1217 and High Sheriff of Staffordshire and Shropshire in 1224. Salisbury's ship was nearly lost in a storm while returning to England in 1225, and he spent some months in refuge at a monastery on the French island of Ré.

Death

Salisbury died not long after his return to England at Salisbury Castle. Roger of Wendover alleged that he was poisoned by Hubert de Burgh. One reliable source, however, states that "there is little evidence [of murder] aside from Roger of Wendover's account in Flores Historiarum".

He was buried at Salisbury Cathedral in Salisbury, Wiltshire, England.

Salisbury's tomb was opened in 1791. Bizarrely, the well-preserved corpse of a rat which carried traces of arsenic, was found inside his skull. The rat is now on display in Salisbury Cathedral.

Likeness
A terracotta statue of Salisbury, dating from 1756, is located in the Great Hall of Lacock Abbey in Lacock, Wiltshire, England. A likeness of his wife Ela is also on display, while several other statues are believed to show their children.

Cultural legacy
The 1762 novel Longsword by Irish writer Thomas Leland was based on his life, which itself inspired the 1767 play The Countess of Salisbury by Hartson Hall that premiered at the Haymarket Theatre in London.

Family
By his wife Ela, Countess of Salisbury, Salisbury had the following children:
 William II Longespée (1212?–1250), who was sometimes called Earl of Salisbury but never legally bore the title because he died before his mother, Countess Ela, who held the earldom until her death in 1261. He married Idoine de Camville.
 Stephen Longespée (died 1260), who was seneschal of Gascony and Justiciar of Ireland, married Emeline de Ridelsford, widow of Hugh de Lacy, 1st Earl of Ulster.
 Richard Longespée, a canon of Salisbury.
 Nicholas Longespée (died 1297), bishop of Salisbury.
 Isabel Longespée, who married Sir William de Vesci.
 Ela Longespée, who first married Thomas de Beaumont, 6th Earl of Warwick, and then married Philip Basset. No issue.
 Ida Longespée, married firstly Ralph de Somery of Dudley. They had no children. She married secondly William de Beauchamp, Baron of Bedford, by whom she had seven children.
 Mary Longespée, married. No issue. [needs citation]
 Pernel Longespée.

References

Sources

1170s births
1226 deaths
Burials at Salisbury Cathedral
Longespee
High Sheriffs of Devon
High Sheriffs of Wiltshire
High Sheriffs of Staffordshire
High Sheriffs of Shropshire
High Sheriffs of Cambridgeshire and Huntingdonshire
High Sheriffs of Somerset
High Sheriffs of Lincolnshire
William Longespée, 3rd Earl of Salisbury
Peers jure uxoris
12th-century English people
13th-century English people
Henry II of England
Male Shakespearean characters
Illegitimate children of Henry II of England
Sons of kings